Clinger-Moses Mill Complex, also known as Clement's Mill, is a historic mill complex located in West Pikeland Township, Chester County, Pennsylvania.  The property includes the site of two mills, a stone dam, a mill house, stone bank barn, and outbuildings.   A former three-story grist mill built in 1860 has been converted to residential use. There is a four-story, three bay by three bay, fieldstone mill building.  A five-bay, frame house has been built on the foundations of a former saw mill. The main house was built in 1801, and is a 2 1/2-story, fieldstone dwelling with a gable roof and two-story rear wing.

It was added to the National Register of Historic Places in 1980.

References

1801 establishments in Pennsylvania
Grinding mills on the National Register of Historic Places in Pennsylvania
Houses completed in 1801
Industrial buildings completed in 1860
Houses in Chester County, Pennsylvania
Grinding mills in Pennsylvania
National Register of Historic Places in Chester County, Pennsylvania